Dmytro Ponomarenko (born 10 February 1991) is a Ukrainian male track cyclist, representing Ukraine at international competitions. He competed at the 2016 UEC European Track Championships in the team pursuit event.

References

1991 births
Living people
Ukrainian male cyclists
Ukrainian track cyclists
Place of birth missing (living people)
21st-century Ukrainian people